Creedence Clearwater Revival Covers the Classics is a compilation album by American rock band Creedence Clearwater Revival. Released in 2009, the album contains cover versions of songs as recorded by the band.

Stephen Thomas Erlewine of Allmusic rated the album three stars out of five, with his review saying, "While it might be hard to discern who this is for[...]it's still a ripping good time, a perfect party record for any occasion."

Track listing
"Good Golly Miss Molly" (John Marascalco, Robert "Bumps" Blackwell) - (from the album Bayou Country, 1969) – 2:41
"I Heard It Through the Grapevine" (Norman Whitfield, Barrett Strong) - (Single version) (from the album Cosmo's Factory, 1970) – 3:51
"Hello Mary Lou" (Gene Pitney) - (from the album Mardi Gras, 1972) – 2:12
"Susie Q" (Part 1) (Dale Hawkins) - (from the album Creedence Clearwater Revival, 1968) – 4:33
"Midnight Special" (traditional) - (from the album Willy and the Poor Boys, 1969) – 4:11
"Ooby Dooby" (Dick Penner, Dick Lee Moore) - (from the album Cosmo's Factory) – 2:05
"The Night Time Is the Right Time" (Lew Herman, Nappy Brown, Ozzie Cadena) - (from the album Green River, 1969) – 3:07
"Cotton Fields" (Lead Belly) - (from the album Willy and the Poor Boys) – 2:55
"Ninety-Nine and a Half" (Wilson Pickett, Steve Cropper, Eddie Floyd) - (from the album Creedence Clearwater Revival) – 3:36
"Before You Accuse Me" (Bo Diddley) - (from the album Cosmo's Factory) – 3:26
"My Baby Left Me" (Arthur Crudup) - (from the album Cosmo's Factory) – 2:17
"I Put a Spell on You" (Jay Hawkins) - (from the album Creedence Clearwater Revival) – 4:31

References

Covers albums
Creedence Clearwater Revival compilation albums
2009 compilation albums
Albums produced by John Fogerty
Albums produced by Stu Cook
Albums produced by Doug Clifford
Albums produced by Saul Zaentz